The Women's 100 Breaststroke at the 2010 FINA World Swimming Championships (25m) was swum 17 – 18 December in Dubai, United Arab Emirates. Preliminary heats and semifinals were on 17 December, the final on 18 December.

55 swimmers swam the race. At the start of the event, the existing World (WR) and Championship records (CR) were:
WR: 1:02.70,  Rebecca Soni, (Manchester, UK, 19 December 2009)
CR: 1:04.22,  Jessica Hardy, (Manchester 2008)

The following records were established during the competition:

Results

Heats

Semifinals
Semifinal 1

Semifinal 2

Final

References

Breaststroke 100 metre, Women's
World Short Course Swimming Championships
2010 in women's swimming